My Heroes Have Always Been Cowboys is a 1991 American Western film starring Scott Glenn and Kate Capshaw, and directed by Stuart Rosenberg.

Plot
Scott Glenn is H.D., a champion bull rider whose career is ruined after being gored by a bull. He returns to his hometown of Guthrie, Oklahoma to discover things have drastically changed — the family farm has been abandoned, his old girlfriend Jolie (Kate Capshaw) is a now a widowed mother, and his sister Cheryl (Tess Harper) has put his father (Ben Johnson) in a nursing home. H.D. rescues his father from the home and returns him to the ranch. But when H.D. leaves the farm to visit Jolie, his father seeks out Cheryl. Cheryl retaliates by threatening to return her father to the nursing home and sell the ranch. At this point, H.D. takes notice of a rodeo  which would give him $100,000 if he can ride four bulls for a total of 32 seconds. H.D. bonds with his father as he gruelingly prepares for a return to the rodeo to win the contest and buy the ranch.

Cast
 Scott Glenn as H.D. Dalton
 Kate Capshaw as Jolie Meadows
 Balthazar Getty as Jud Meadows
 Ben Johnson as Jesse Dalton
 Gary Busey as Clint Hornby
 Tess Harper as Cheryl Dalton-Hornby
 Mickey Rooney as Junior
 Clarence Williams III as Deputy Sheriff Virgil
 Bill Clymer as Rodeo Announcer
 Dub Taylor as Gimme Cap

Reception
Balthazar Getty was nominated for best young actor of the year by the Young Artist Awards.

Roger Ebert of the Chicago Sun-Times said, "One thing I enjoyed was the work of Scott Glenn, an unsung but always interesting actor (The Right Stuff, The River, The Silence of the Lambs), who plays the cowboy with a taciturn and weathered conviction. I also liked the unstudied sincerity of the great Ben Johnson, as his father (he was already playing this role 20 years ago, in The Last Picture Show). I liked the way old character actors like Dub Taylor turned up in a poker game, and it was fun to see Mickey Rooney, although he should have turned the energy down a notch. ... The most interesting element of My Heroes Have Always Been Cowboys is the cantankerous old man who is indeed impossible, and forgetful, and careless, and impossible to please. If they leave him in the nursing home he'll die, but if they let him live alone he'll sooner or later kill himself or somebody else. So what should they do about him? Because this was the only question in the movie that had not already been answered in dozens of other films, I waited for the movie to attend to it. But of course room had to be made for the Rocky ending.

The score by James Horner was well received.

References

External links
 
 
 

1991 films
1991 independent films
1991 Western (genre) films
American Western (genre) films
Neo-Western films
American independent films
Country music films
Films scored by James Horner
Films directed by Stuart Rosenberg
Rodeo in film
The Samuel Goldwyn Company films
1991 drama films
1990s English-language films
1990s American films